Iran has been participating at the  Deaflympics since 1957 and  has earned a total of 234 medals.

Medal tables

Medals by Summer Games

Medals by Winter Games

Medals by summer sport

Medals by winter sport 
haven't.

List of medalists

Summer Games

Winter Games

See also
Iran at the Paralympics
Iran at the Olympics

References

External links
Deaflympics official website

Parasports in Iran